Noi (Noah) Abramovich Trotsky (March 15, 1895 – November 19, 1940) was a Soviet architect.

Biography 

Born in St. Petersburg to a family of a typesetter, Trotsky took art classes from the renowned painter Nicholas Roerich, graduated from the Academy of Arts in 1920 (then named "Petrograd Free Art Workshops") and 2nd Polytechnic in 1921.  He also apprenticed with "Red Doric" architect Ivan Fomin around the same time.  

Often cited for his turn from Constructivism towards Stalinist neo-Classicism in the 1930s, Trotsky's training under Fomin indicates a long familiarity with classical forms.  The high point of his Constructivist work is probably the Kirov District Administration building of 1938.  

Trotsky's best-known project is the House of Soviets in Saint Petersburg. At the year of its completion, the building was the largest office building in Saint Petersburg (then Leningrad). In March 1936, the Leningrad Soviet decided to relocate all the city's administration to a new site at the southern end of International Avenue. In open tender, Trotsky's project was selected over ten others. It was completed after Trotsky death, with co-authors Modest Shepilevsky and Yakov Lukin, and it features an impressive 11-meter-high frieze by Soviet sculptor Nikolai Tomsky.

Trotsky taught at the Academy of Arts' successor, VKhuTeIn (:ru:ВХУТЕИН, :ru:Высший художественно-технический институт, Higher Institute of Arts and Design, later renamed into институт живописи, скульптуры и архитектуры (им. Репина), (Repin) Institute of Painting, Sculpture and Architecture), from 1929, was Professor there from 1939, and taught at the Saint-Petersburg State University of Architecture and Civil Engineering.  He died in 1940 and is buried at the Volkovo Cemetery in Saint Petersburg.

Work 

(in St. Petersburg unless otherwise noted)

 2nd Power Station in Novgorodskaya Street, 1923
 Kirov Palace of Culture on Vasilievsky Island, 1931–1937
 Kirov District Administration, with the monument to Sergey Kirov by sculptor Nikolai Tomsky, 1938
 Kirov Meat Plant, 1930–1935
 Bolshoy Dom, prison of the internal security services, Liteyny Prospekt, with co-designers Alexander Gegello and Andrey Ol, 1931–1935
 House of the Soviets, 1936–1941
 Opera Theater in Samara, with Nikolai Katsenelenbogen, 1936–1938

Sources 
 biography (in Russian)
 Berkovich, Gary. Reclaiming a History. Jewish Architects in Imperial Russia and the USSR. Volume 2. Soviet Avant-garde: 1917–1933. Weimar und Rostock: Grunberg Verlag. 2021. P. 92. 

1895 births
1940 deaths
Architects from Saint Petersburg
Russian avant-garde
Constructivist architects
Modernist architects